Hans Christiaens (born 12 January 1964, in Belgium) is a Belgian retired footballer.

References

External links
 

Association football forwards
Living people
Belgian footballers
1964 births
Belgium international footballers
K.S.V. Waregem players
Brøndby IF players
Club Brugge KV players
Belgian expatriate footballers
Expatriate men's footballers in Denmark
Belgian expatriate sportspeople in Denmark
K.S.K. Beveren players
K.S.K. Ronse players
People from Zele
Footballers from East Flanders